The following highways are numbered 25:

International
 Asian Highway 25
 European route E25 
 Arab Mashreq Road 25

Argentina
 National Route 25

Australia
 Barton Highway (A25) ( - Under Construction)
 Palmerston Highway (State Route 25) – (Queensland)
 - King Island (Tasmania)

Austria
 Welser Autobahn

Canada
 Alberta Highway 25
 Manitoba Highway 25
 Ontario Highway 25 (former)
 Prince Edward Island Route 25
 Quebec Autoroute 25
 Saskatchewan Highway 25

China
  G25 Expressway

Colombia
  National Route 25

Czech Republic
 I/25 Highway; Czech: Silnice I/25

Finland
 Finnish national road 25

Germany
 Bundesautobahn 25

Iceland
 Route 25 (Iceland)

India

Ireland
  N25 road (Ireland)

Israel
 Highway 25 (Israel)

Italy
 Autostrada A25

Japan
 Japan National Route 25
 Meihan Expressway
 Nishi-Meihan Expressway

Jordan

Korea, South
 Expressway 25
 Honam Expressway
 Nonsan–Cheonan Expressway
 National Route 25

Mexico
 Mexican Federal Highway 25

New Zealand
 New Zealand State Highway 25
 New Zealand State Highway 25A

Romania
 Drumul Național 25 (DN25)

United Kingdom
 British A25 (Addington-Guilford)
 M25 (London Circular)
 A25 road (Northern Ireland)

United States
 Interstate 25
 U.S. Route 25
 U.S. Route 25W
 U.S. Route 25E
 New England Route 25 (former)
 Alabama State Route 25
 Arkansas Highway 25
 California State Route 25
 County Route A25 (California)
 County Route J25 (California)
 County Route S25 (California)
Colorado State Highway 25 (1938-1968) (former)
 Connecticut Route 25
 Florida State Road 25
 County Road 25 (Lake County, Florida)
 County Road 25 (Marion County, Florida)
 Georgia State Route 25
 Idaho State Highway 25
 Illinois Route 25
 Indiana State Road 25
 Iowa Highway 25
 K-25 (Kansas highway)
 Louisiana Highway 25
 Maine State Route 25
 Maryland Route 25
 Massachusetts Route 25
 M-25 (Michigan highway)
 Minnesota State Highway 25
 County Road 25 (Hennepin County, Minnesota)
 County Road 25 (Ramsey County, Minnesota)
 County Road 25 (Washington County, Minnesota)
 Mississippi Highway 25
 Missouri Route 25
 Montana Highway 25
 Nebraska Highway 25
 Nevada State Route 25 (former)
 New Hampshire Route 25
 New Jersey Route 25 (former)
 County Route 25 (Monmouth County, New Jersey)
 New York State Route 25
 County Route 25 (Allegany County, New York)
 County Route 25 (Cattaraugus County, New York)
 County Route 25 (Chenango County, New York)
 County Route 25 (Columbia County, New York)
 County Route 25 (Essex County, New York)
 County Route 25 (Genesee County, New York)
 County Route 25 (Jefferson County, New York)
 County Route 25 (Nassau County, New York)
 County Route 25 (Niagara County, New York)
 County Route 25 (Oneida County, New York)
 County Route 25 (Onondaga County, New York)
 County Route 25 (Ontario County, New York)
 County Route 25 (Oswego County, New York)
 County Route 25 (Otsego County, New York)
 County Route 25 (Schoharie County, New York)
 County Route 25 (Suffolk County, New York)
 County Route 25 (Sullivan County, New York)
 County Route 25 (Tioga County, New York)
 County Route 25 (Ulster County, New York)
 County Route 25 (Washington County, New York)
 County Route 25 (Westchester County, New York)
 County Route 25 (Yates County, New York)
 North Carolina Highway 25 (former)
 North Dakota Highway 25
 Ohio State Route 25
 Oklahoma State Highway 25
Redwood Highway No. 25 in Oregon
 Pennsylvania Route 25
 South Carolina Highway 25 (former)
 South Dakota Highway 25
 Tennessee State Route 25
 Texas State Highway 25
 Texas State Highway Loop 25
 Farm to Market Road 25 (former)
 Texas Park Road 25
 Utah State Route 25
 Vermont Route 25
 State Route 25 (Virginia 1918-1933) (former)
 Washington State Route 25
 West Virginia Route 25
 Wisconsin Highway 25

Territories
 Puerto Rico Highway 25
 Puerto Rico Highway 25R

See also 
 List of A25 roads
 List of highways numbered 25A
 List of highways numbered 25B
 List of highways numbered 25C